You Came Back is a 2020 Italian drama thriller film directed by Stefano Mordini, based on the 2012 novel of the same name by Christopher Coake. It stars Stefano Accorsi, Valeria Golino, Maya Sansa and Serena Rossi.

It was selected out of competition as the closing film of the 77th Venice International Film Festival.

Cast 
 Stefano Accorsi as Marco
 Valeria Golino as Perla
 Maya Sansa as Clara
 Serena Rossi as Anita
 Antonia Truppo
 Lino Musella

References

External links
 

2020 films
2020 thriller drama films
Italian thriller drama films
Italian ghost films
Films about child death
Films about remarriage
Films based on American thriller novels
Films directed by Stefano Mordini
Films shot in Venice
Films set in Venice
Warner Bros. films
2020s ghost films
2020s Italian-language films
2020s Italian films